Thrikkovil - Sree Padmanabhaswamy temple, is a Hindu temple with Lord Vishnu as the presiding deity, located at Vallicode village in Pathanamthitta District in Kerala, India.

The temple comes under the Travancore Devaswom Board. As per local folklore, it is considered the second one of its kind after the famous Padmanabhaswamy temple in Thiruvananthapuram. More spectacularly the 10-day festival includes Rupmani Swayambaram.

In going with the simplicity and elegant architecture of temples in Kerala, the temple premises here present a very serene and spiritual outlook. There is a temple pond adjoining which abound with blooming lotuses.

See also
 Pathanamthitta District
 Temples of Kerala
 Thazhoor Bhagavathy Kshetram

References
 Temple architecture coverage & details  in Udayamritham TV program.
 Sree Krishna Jayanthi Celebrations (2012)
 Wikimapia view of the temple

Hindu temples in Pathanamthitta district
Vishnu temples